Slow Motion Daydream is the sixth studio album by Everclear. It was released in the U.S. in 2003 on Capitol Records and recorded in 2002.

Production
The first single released to radio from Slow Motion Daydream was "Volvo Driving Soccer Mom", followed by second single "The New York Times".

Though the album debuted better than the band's last album at 33 on the Billboard charts, the album quickly fell off the charts. The album has sold 106,000 copies.

This was the last album of new material to feature longtime members Craig Montoya and Greg Eklund who left the band later in August of that year.

Track listing

An early leaked track list featured the songs "Your New Disease," "Happy," and "Sex with a Movie Star."  At some point after the completion of this version of the album, an additional recording session produced the new songs "I Want to Die a Beautiful Death," "The New York Times," and "White Noise," which Art Alexakis decided to include on the album instead.  "Your New Disease" and "Happy" were relegated to the b-side of the "Volvo Driving Soccer Mom" single, while "Sex with a Movie Star" finally surfaced on the Ten Years Gone career retrospective.

Personnel
Art Alexakis – guitar, vocals
Craig Montoya – bass
Greg Eklund – drums

References

External links

Everclear (band) albums
Capitol Records albums
2003 albums
Albums produced by Lars Fox
Albums produced by Art Alexakis